Bruce Allen  (born May 11, 1959) is an American physicist and director of the Max Planck Institute for Gravitational Physics in Hannover Germany and leader of the Einstein@Home project for the LIGO Scientific Collaboration. He is also a physics professor at the University of Wisconsin–Milwaukee and the initiator / project leader of smartmontools hard disk utility.

He has done research work on models of the very early universe (inflationary cosmology, cosmic strings).  Allen currently leads a research group working on the detection of gravitational waves. In this role, he was one of the first scientists to become aware of the initial detection of GW150914 at LIGO, in September 2015. Allen's research work has been funded by the US National Science Foundation since 1987.

Education and positions 
1976      Graduated from Wayland High School, Wayland, Massachusetts, USA.  (Allen belonged to the class of 1977, but graduated a year early with the class of 1976).
1980       B.S. in Physics, Massachusetts Institute of Technology (advisor: Rainer Weiss)
1984      PhD. in Gravitation and Cosmology, University of Cambridge, England (advisor: Stephen Hawking)
1983–1985 Postdoctoral Fellow, University of California Santa Barbara (Physics Department, advisors James Hartle and Gary Horowitz)
1985–1986 Postdoctoral Fellow, Tufts University (Physics Department, advisors Alex Vilenkin and Larry Ford)
1986–1987 Chercheur Associé, Observatoire de Paris - Meudon, France (advisors Brandon Carter and Thibault Damour)
1987–1989 Research Assistant Professor, Tufts University
1989–1992 Assistant Professor of Physics, University of Wisconsin–Milwaukee
1992–1997 Associate Professor of Physics, University of Wisconsin–Milwaukee
1997–2007 Professor of Physics, University of Wisconsin–Milwaukee
2007–present Adjunct Professor of Physics, University of Wisconsin–Milwaukee
2007–present Director, Department of Observational Relativity and Cosmology, Albert Einstein Institute, Hannover, Germany
2008–present Honorary Professor of Physics, Leibniz University Hannover

Visiting appointments 
1994     Six months, Isaac Newton Mathematical Institute, Cambridge, England
1995     Six months, Caltech Relativity Group
1997     One year, Caltech LIGO Project
1999     Six months, Caltech LIGO Project
2000–2005 Few months/year, Albert Einstein Institute, Potsdam, Germany

Awards 
1980 Phi Beta Kappa, MIT
1980–85    NSF Graduate Fellowship (declined)
1980–82    Churchill Scholarship (declined)
1980–82   Marshall Scholar, University of Cambridge
1981     Knight Prize, University of Cambridge
1990     First Prize, Gravity Research Foundation
1997     University of Wisconsin – Milwaukee, Graduate School Research Award
2002–03   Friedrich Wilhelm Bessel Award, Alexander von Humboldt Foundation
2004     Elected Fellow, Institute of Physics (UK)
2005     Elected Fellow, American Physical Society
2016  Niedersächsischer Staatspreis 2016 (shared with Buonanno and Danzmann)
2016 Gruber Cosmology Prize (as part of the LIGO Scientific Collaboration)
2016 Special Breakthrough Prize in Fundamental Physics (as part of the LIGO Scientific Collaboration)
2017 Einstein Medal (as part of the LIGO Scientific Collaboration)
2017 Princess of Asturias Award for Scientific and Technical Research (as part of the LIGO Scientific Collaboration)

References

External links

Bruce Allen faculty page at University of Wisconsin–Milwaukee
Bruce Allen's page at the Albert Einstein Institute
Bruce Allen's publications on Google Scholar

1959 births
American astronomers
American expatriates in Germany
Living people
MIT Department of Physics alumni
Alumni of the University of Cambridge
University of California, Santa Barbara alumni
Tufts University faculty
University of Wisconsin–Milwaukee faculty
Fellows of the Institute of Physics
Marshall Scholars
20th-century American physicists
21st-century American physicists
Wayland High School alumni
Fellows of the American Physical Society
Max Planck Institute directors